Out of the Shadows was an unfinished 1931 feature film from A. R. Harwood. He made it after a number of years of working in distribution with the intention of producing Australia's first talking motion picture. The script was by J. Summers, "a Victorian who has had experience in Hollywood."

Production
The movie was a "society romance" shot in Melbourne using a sound-on-disc recording system. During filming, Senator John Barnes, then leader of the Senate, paid a visit to the St Kilda Studio where it was being shot. Independent Films announced plans to make four more movies. However the only set of wax discs buckled in a heat wave before the film was completed and it was never released. The honour of making the first Australian "talkie" went to F.W. Thring's Diggers (1931).

Harwood recovered and used the same cast and crew to make two low-budget films, Spur of the Moment (1931) and Isle of Intrigue (1931).

Cast
William Greene
Paul Plunkett
Edna Lyall
Syd HolIister

References

Australian romantic drama films
1930s unfinished films